The E. M. Forster Award is a $20,000 award given annually to an Irish or British writer to fund a period of travel in the United States. The award, named after the English novelist E. M. Forster, is administered by the American Academy of Arts and Letters. Academy members nominate authors and winners are selected by a rotating committee.

Past winners

Frank Tuohy 1972
Margaret Drabble 1973
Paul Bailey 1974
Seamus Heaney 1975
Jon Stallworthy 1976
David Cook 1977
Bruce Chatwin 1979
F.T. Prince 1982
Humphrey Carpenter 1984
Julian Barnes 1986
Blake Morrison 1988
A. N. Wilson 1989
Jeanette Winterson 1990
Alan Hollinghurst 1991
Timothy Mo 1992
Sean O'Brien 1993
Janice Galloway 1994
Colm Tóibín 1995
Jim Crace 1996
Glyn Maxwell 1997
Kate Atkinson 1998
Nick Hornby 1999
Carol Ann Duffy 2000
Marina Carr 2001
Helen Simpson 2002
Andrew O'Hagan 2003
Robin Robertson 2004
Dennis O'Driscoll 2005
Geoff Dyer 2006
Jez Butterworth 2007
John Lanchester 2008
Paul Farley 2009
Dan Rhodes 2010
Rachel Seiffert 2011
David Mitchell 2012
Adam Foulds 2013
Sarah Hall 2014
Adam Thirlwell 2015
Sinéad Morrissey 2016
Robert MacFarlane 2017
Jon McGregor 2018
Sally Rooney 2019
Stephen Sexton 2020

References

External links
Contact information
Past winners

American literary awards
Awards of the American Academy of Arts and Letters